Yong-Jiu Grocery Store is a 2019 Taiwanese television series directed by Kao Pin-chuan and Tseng Ying-ting. The series was adapted from the comic by Ruan Guangmin of the same name, and starring Derek Chang and Christina Mok. It airs on CTS Main Channel and SET Metro starting August 16, 2019.

Yong-Jiu Grocery Store became the 17th-highest rated Taiwanese drama in 2019.

Plot
Yang Chun-Lung (Derek Chang) is an elite employee of a construction company. Just turned 30, he bought a house, his job was also favorable, and he became the youngest senior manager of the company. The prospect is so open, but behind that are days of intense work, social parties that make him tired and confused. Seeing the fathers and uncles in the company sacrifice their health, family, and friendship for the sake of work, he suddenly wondered if this was the life he wanted?
And then a phone call broke the trajectory of Yang Chun-Lung's life. His grandfather Yang Chin-te (Lin I-hsiung) suddenly fell seriously ill, the situation was not very optimistic. Chun-lung quit his job, rushed back to his hometown, only in time to see his grandfather lying on a hospital bed, falling into a coma, unconscious.

After the doctor explained his illness, Chun-lung planned to close the grocery store. If Grandpa regains consciousness, he will bring him back to Taipei to live with him. Grandpa's longtime neighbors, though sorry for the grocery store and his hard work for many years, but they also understand Chun-lung's difficulty. In just one night, Chun-lung was immediately summoned to Taipei by the company to handle a difficult project. In the process, facing the questioning voice of the old homeowner Zhao, Chun-lung dreamily discovered: It turns out that although life in Taipei is so bustling, what he nostalates is his childhood in hometown....

Cast
Derek Chang as Yang Chun-Lung
Chen Dingzhong as Yang Chun-Lung (child)
Chen Shaohui as Yang Chun-Lung (teenager)
Christina Mok as Chen Chao-Chun
Weng Nini as Chen Chao-Chun (young)
Lin I-hsiung as Yang Chin-te
Edison Wang as Yang Chin-te (young)
Lei Hung as Yong Bo
J.C. Lin as Yong Bo (young)
Lung Shao-hua as Miao Gong
Lin Yu-hsien as Miao Gong (young)
Huang Hsi-tien as Shui Kun
Emerson Tsai as Shui Kun (young)
Wang Man-chiao as Shu-chih
Yang Min as Shu-chih (young)
Roy Chiu as Chiang En-Pei
Hou Yan-xi as Tsai Liang-Chin
Xie En Ci as Tsai Liang-Chin (young)
Allen Chen as Jian Zhong Sheng
Hu Qian He as Jian Zhong Shen (young)
Ding Guo Lin as Yu Yun
Sun Ke Fan as Yu Yun (young)
Chen Ya Chen as Feng Yu
Zhang Wen Qi as Zheng Shu Fen
Lu Yi En as Zheng Shu Fen (young)
Gingle Wang as Yin Yueh

Reception

Awards and nominations

Broadcast

References

External links
 
Official site at CTS 
Official site at SETTV  
Official Facebook 

Taiwanese romance television series
Taiwanese drama television series
2019 Taiwanese television series debuts
2019 Taiwanese television series endings
Chinese Television System original programming
Sanlih E-Television original programming
Star Chinese Channel original programming
Television shows set in Taiwan
Television shows set in Taipei
Television shows set in Tainan
Television shows set in Chiayi
Television shows set in Yunlin County